Isaac Cleveland Boyd (November 3, 1884 – January 8, 1969) was a member of the Virginia House of Delegates.

References

External links

1884 births
1969 deaths
Democratic Party members of the Virginia House of Delegates
People from Buchanan County, Virginia
20th-century American politicians